In machine learning, multiple-instance learning (MIL) is a type of supervised learning.  Instead of receiving a set of instances which are individually labeled, the learner receives a set of labeled bags, each containing many instances. In the simple case of multiple-instance binary classification, a bag may be labeled negative if all the instances in it are negative.  On the other hand, a bag is labeled positive if there is at least one instance in it which is positive.  From a collection of labeled bags, the learner tries to either (i) induce a concept that will label individual instances correctly or (ii) learn how to label bags without inducing the concept.

Babenko (2008) gives a simple example for MIL. Imagine several people, and each of them has a key chain that contains few keys. Some of these people are able to enter a certain room, and some aren’t. The task is then to predict whether a certain key or a certain key chain can get you into that room. To solve this problem we need to find the exact key that is common for all the “positive” key chains. If we can correctly identify this key, we can also correctly classify an entire key chain - positive if it contains the required key, or negative if it doesn't.

Machine learning
Depending on the type and variation in training data, machine learning can be roughly categorized into three frameworks: supervised learning, unsupervised learning, and reinforcement learning. Multiple instance learning (MIL) falls under the supervised learning framework, where every training instance has a label, either discrete or real valued. MIL deals with problems with incomplete knowledge of labels in training sets. More precisely, in multiple-instance learning, the training set consists of labeled “bags”, each of which is a collection of unlabeled instances. A bag is positively labeled if at least one instance in it is positive, and is negatively labeled if all instances in it are negative. The goal of the MIL is to predict the labels of new, unseen bags.

History
Keeler et al., in his work in the early 1990s was the first one to explore the area of MIL. The actual term multi-instance learning was introduced in the middle of the 1990s, by Dietterich et al. while they were investigating the problem of drug activity prediction. They tried to create a learning system that could predict whether new molecule was qualified to make some drug, or not, through analyzing a collection of known molecules. Molecules can have many alternative low-energy states, but only one, or some of them, are qualified to make a drug. The problem arose because scientists could only determine if molecule is qualified, or not, but they couldn't say exactly which of its low-energy shapes are responsible for that.
				
One of the proposed ways to solve this problem was to use supervised learning, and regard all the low-energy shapes of the qualified molecule as positive training instances, while all of the low-energy shapes of unqualified molecules as negative instances. Dietterich et al. showed that such method would have a high false positive noise, from all low-energy shapes that are mislabeled as positive, and thus wasn't really useful. Their approach was to regard each molecule as a labeled bag, and all the alternative low-energy shapes of that molecule as instances in the bag, without individual labels. Thus formulating multiple-instance learning.  
					
Solution to the multiple instance learning problem that Dietterich et al. proposed is the axis-parallel rectangle (APR) algorithm. It attempts to search for appropriate axis-parallel rectangles constructed by the conjunction of the features. They tested the algorithm on Musk dataset, which is a concrete test data of drug activity prediction and the most popularly used benchmark in multiple-instance learning. APR algorithm achieved the best result, but APR was designed with Musk data in mind.

Problem of multi-instance learning is not unique to drug finding. In 1998, Maron and Ratan found another application of multiple instance learning to scene classification in machine vision, and devised Diverse Density framework. Given an image, an instance is taken to be one or more fixed-size subimages, and the bag of instances is taken to be the entire image. An image is labeled positive if it contains the target scene - a waterfall, for example - and negative otherwise. Multiple instance learning can be used to learn the properties of the subimages which characterize the target scene. From there on, these frameworks have been applied to a wide spectrum of applications, ranging from image concept learning and text categorization, to stock market prediction.

Examples
Take image classification for example . Given an image, we want to know its target class based on its visual content. For instance, the target class might be "beach", where the image contains both "sand" and "water". The bag is labeled positive ("beach") if it contains both "sand" region instances and "water" region instances.

Examples of where MIL is applied are:
 Molecule activity
 Predicting binding sites of Calmodulin binding proteins
 Predicting function for alternatively spliced isoforms ,
 Image classification 
 Text or document categorization 
 Predicting functional binding sites of MicroRNA targets 
 Medical image classification , 
Numerous researchers have worked on adapting classical classification techniques, such as support vector machines or boosting, to work within the context of multiple-instance learning.

Definitions 
Let  be the space of labels, then a "multiple instance concept" is a map . The goal of MIL is to learn such a concept. The remainder of the article will focus on binary classification, where .

Assumptions 
Most of the work on multiple instance learning, including Dietterich et al. (1997) and Maron & Lozano-Pérez (1997) early papers, make the assumption regarding the relationship between the instances within a bag and the class label of the bag. Because of its importance, that assumption is often called standard MI assumption.

Standard assumption 
The standard assumption takes each instance  to have an associated label  which is hidden to the learner. The pair  is called an "instance-level concept". A bag is now viewed as a multiset of instance-level concepts, and is labeled positive if at least one of its instances has a positive label, and negative if all of its instances have negative labels. Formally, let  be a bag. Standard MI assumption is asymmetric, which means that if the positive and negative labels are reversed, the assumption has a different meaning. Because of that, when we use this assumption, we need to be clear which label should be the positive one.

Standard assumption might be viewed as too strict, and therefore in the recent years, researchers tried to relax that position, which gave rise to other more loose assumptions. Reason for this is the belief that standard MI assumption is appropriate for the Musk dataset, but since MIL can be applied to numerous other problems, some different assumptions could probably be more appropriate. Guided by that idea, Weidmann  formulated a hierarchy of generalized instance-based assumptions for MIL. It consists of the standard MI assumption and three types of generalized MI assumptions, each more general than the last, standard  presence-based  threshold-based  count-based, with the count-based assumption being the most general and the standard assumption being the least general. One would expect an algorithm which performs well under one of these assumptions to perform at least as well under the less general assumptions.

Presence-, threshold-, and count-based assumptions 
The presence-based assumption is a generalization of the standard assumption, wherein a bag must contain one or more instances that belong to a set of required instance-level concepts in order to be labeled positive. Formally, let  be the set of required instance-level concepts, and let  denote the number of times the instance-level concept  occurs in the bag . Then  for all . Note that, by taking  to contain only one instance-level concept, the presence-based assumption reduces to the standard assumption.

A further generalization comes with the threshold-based assumption, where each required instance-level concept must occur not only once in a bag, but some minimum (threshold) number of times in order for the bag to be labeled positive. With the notation above, to each required instance-level concept  is associated a threshold . For a bag ,  for all .

The count-based assumption is a final generalization which enforces both lower and upper bounds for the number of times a required concept can occur in a positively labeled bag.

GMIL assumption
Scott, Zhang, and Brown (2005)  describe another generalization of the standard model, which they call "generalized multiple instance learning" (GMIL). The GMIL assumption specifies a set of required instances . A bag  is labeled positive if it contains instances which are sufficiently close to at least  of the required instances . Under only this condition, the GMIL assumption is equivalent to the presence-based assumption. However, Scott et al. describe a further generalization in which there is a set of attraction points  and a set of repulsion points . A bag is labeled positive if and only if it contains instances which are sufficiently close to at least  of the attraction points and are sufficiently close to at most  of the repulsion points. This condition is strictly more general than the presence-based, though it does not fall within the above hierarchy.

Collective assumption 
In contrast to the previous assumptions where the bags were viewed as fixed, the collective assumption views a bag  as a distribution  over instances , and similarly view labels as a distribution  over instances. The goal of an algorithm operating under the collective assumption is then to model the distribution .

Since  is typically considered fixed but unknown, algorithms instead focus on computing the empirical version: , where  is the number of instances in bag . Since  is also typically taken to be fixed but unknown, most collective-assumption based methods focus on learning this distribution, as in the single-instance version.

While the collective assumption weights every instance with equal importance, Foulds extended the collective assumption to incorporate instance weights.

Algorithms 
 There are two major flavors of algorithms for Multiple Instance Learning: instance-based and metadata-based, or embedding-based algorithms. The term "instance-based" denotes that the algorithm attempts to find a set of representative instances based on an MI assumption and classify future bags from these representatives. By contrast, metadata-based algorithms make no assumptions about the relationship between instances and bag labels, and instead try to extract instance-independent information (or metadata) about the bags in order to learn the concept. For a survey of some of the modern MI algorithms see Foulds and Frank.

Instance-based algorithms 
The earliest proposed MI algorithms were a set of "iterated-discrimination" algorithms developed by Dietterich et al., and Diverse Density developed by Maron and Lozano-Pérez. Both of these algorithms operated under the standard assumption.

Iterated-discrimination
Broadly, all of the iterated-discrimination algorithms consist of two phases. The first phase is to grow an axis parallel rectangle (APR) which contains at least one instance from each positive bag and no instances from any negative bags. This is done iteratively: starting from a random instance  in a positive bag, the APR is expanded to the smallest APR covering any instance  in a new positive bag . This process is repeated until the APR covers at least one instance from each positive bag. Then, each instance  contained in the APR is given a "relevance", corresponding to how many negative points it excludes from the APR if removed. The algorithm then selects candidate representative instances in order of decreasing relevance, until no instance contained in a negative bag is also contained in the APR. The algorithm repeats these growth and representative selection steps until convergence, where APR size at each iteration is taken to be only along candidate representatives.

After the first phase, the APR is thought to tightly contain only the representative attributes. The second phase expands this tight APR as follows: a Gaussian distribution is centered at each attribute and a looser APR is drawn such that positive instances will fall outside the tight APR with fixed probability. Though iterated discrimination techniques work well with the standard assumption, they do not generalize well to other MI assumptions.

Diverse Density
In its simplest form, Diverse Density (DD) assumes a single representative instance  as the concept. This representative instance must be "dense" in that it is much closer to instances from positive bags than from negative bags, as well as "diverse" in that it is close to at least one instance from each positive bag.

Letting  denote the jth instance of bag i, the noisy-or model gives:
 
 
 is taken to be the scaled distance  where  is the scaling vector. The candidate concept  can be obtained through gradient methods. Though Diverse Density was originally proposed by Maron et al. in 1998, more recent MIL algorithms use the DD framework, such as EM-DD in 2001  and DD-SVM in 2004, and MILES in 2006 

A number of single-instance algorithms have also been adapted to a multiple-instance context under the standard assumption, including
 Support vector machines
 Artificial neural networks
 Decision trees
 Boosting

Post 2000, there was a movement away from the standard assumption and the development of algorithms designed to tackle the more general assumptions listed above.

 Weidmann  proposes a Two-Level Classification (TLC) algorithm to learn concepts under the count-based assumption. The first step tries to learn instance-level concepts by building a decision tree from each instance in each bag of the training set. Each bag is then mapped to a feature vector based on the counts in the decision tree. In the second step, a single-instance algorithm is run on the feature vectors to learn the concept 
 Scott et al.  proposed an algorithm, GMIL-1, to learn concepts under the GMIL assumption in 2005. GMIL-1 enumerates all axis-parallel rectangles  in the original space of instances, and defines a new feature space of Boolean vectors. A single-instance algorithm can then be applied to learn the concept in this new feature space.

Because of the high dimensionality of the new feature space and the cost of explicitly enumerating all APRs of the original instance space, GMIL-1 is inefficient both in terms of computation and memory. GMIL-2 was developed as a refinement of GMIL-1 in an effort to improve efficiency. GMIL-2 pre-processes the instances to find a set of candidate representative instances. GMIL-2 then maps each bag to a Boolean vector, as in GMIL-1, but only considers APRs corresponding to unique subsets of the candidate representative instances. This significantly reduces the memory and computational requirements.

 Xu (2003)  proposed several algorithms based on logistic regression and boosting methods to learn concepts under the collective assumption.

Metadata-based (or embedding-based) algorithms 
By mapping each bag to a feature vector of metadata, metadata-based algorithms allow the flexibility of using an arbitrary single-instance algorithm to perform the actual classification task. Future bags are simply mapped (embedded) into the feature space of metadata and labeled by the chosen classifier. Therefore, much of the focus for metadata-based algorithms is on what features or what type of embedding leads to effective classification. Note that some of the previously mentioned algorithms, such as TLC and GMIL could be considered metadata-based.

 One approach is to let the metadata for each bag be some set of statistics over the instances in the bag. The SimpleMI algorithm takes this approach, where the metadata of a bag is taken to be a simple summary statistic, such as the average or minimum and maximum of each instance variable taken over all instances in the bag. There are other algorithms which use more complex statistics, but SimpleMI was shown to be surprisingly competitive for a number of datasets, despite its apparent lack of complexity.
 Another common approach is to consider the geometry of the bags themselves as metadata. This is the approach taken by the MIGraph and miGraph algorithms, which represent each bag as a graph whose nodes are the instances in the bag. There is an edge between two nodes if the distance (up to some metric on the instance space) between the corresponding instances is less than some threshold. Classification is done via an SVM with a graph kernel (MIGraph and miGraph only differ in their choice of kernel). Similar approaches are taken by MILES  and MInD. MILES represents a bag by its similarities to instances in the training set, while MInD represents a bag by its distances to other bags.
 A modification of k-nearest neighbors (kNN) can also be considered a metadata-based algorithm with geometric metadata, though the mapping between bags and metadata features is not explicit. However, it is necessary to specify the metric used to compute the distance between bags. Wang and Zucker (2000)  suggest the (maximum and minimum, respectively) Hausdorff metrics for bags  and :
 
 
They define two variations of kNN, Bayesian-kNN and citation-kNN, as adaptations of the traditional nearest-neighbor problem to the multiple-instance setting.

Generalizations 
So far this article has considered multiple instance learning exclusively in the context of binary classifiers. However, the generalizations of single-instance binary classifiers can carry over to the multiple-instance case.

 One such generalization is the multiple-instance multiple-label problem (MIML), where each bag can now be associated with any subset of the space of labels. Zhou and Zhang (2006)  propose a solution to the MIML problem via a reduction to either a multiple-instance or multiple-concept problem.
 Another obvious generalization is to multiple-instance regression. Here, each bag is associated with a single real number as in standard regression. Much like the standard assumption, MI regression assumes there is one instance in each bag, called the "prime instance", which determines the label for the bag (up to noise). The ideal goal of MI regression would be to find a hyperplane which minimizes the square loss of the prime instances in each bag, but the prime instances are hidden. In fact, Ray and Page (2001)  show that finding a best fit hyperplane which fits one instance from each bag is intractable if there are fewer than three instances per bag, and instead develop an algorithm for approximation. Many of the algorithms developed for MI classification may also provide good approximations to the MI regression problem.

See also
Supervised learning
Multi-label classification

References

Further reading
Recent reviews of the MIL literature include:
, which provides an extensive review and comparative study of the different paradigms, 
, which provides a thorough review of the different assumptions used by different paradigms in the literature.

Machine learning